The 1893 Mercer Baptists football team represented Mercer University in the 1893 college football season. They finished with a record of 0–1 as they lost their only game 6–10.

Schedule

References

Mercer
Mercer Bears football seasons
College football winless seasons
Mercer Baptists football